Below is a selected discography for Nino Rota (1911–1979).
 
 He was a prolific composer; there are a great many recordings of all of his music—both popular and classical; and it would be impossible to list all of them.  Indeed, there are new performances and recordings of Rota's music being made to this day.

Nino Rota is best known for his many film scores—in particular for the seminal Fellini films La Strada (1954), La Dolce Vita (1960), 8 1/2 (1963), Juliet of the Spirits (1965), and Amarcord (1974). He also wrote the scores for Franco Zeffirelli's Romeo and Juliet (1968), Luchino Visconti's The Leopard, and Francis Ford Coppola's The Godfather (1972) and The Godfather Part II.  For Fellini alone, Rota produced almost 80 film scores starting with The White Sheik in 1952 and ending with the unfairly forgotten Orchestra Rehearsal in 1979, the year of the composer's death.

Rota's film scores were a great commercial success.  The soundtrack album of Romeo and Juliet, with combined dialogue and music, reached number two and spent 74 weeks on the Billboard charts. The theme song for La Strada sold more than two million copies in Italy alone.

The film scores won many awards. For example, the score for The Godfather was nominated for an Oscar, won a British Academy Film Award, a Golden Globe Award, and a Grammy.

Less well known is the fact that Rota was a prolific composer of chamber music, operas, and orchestral pieces. In all he produced four symphonies, twelve operas, five ballets, three piano concertos, three cello concertos, various choral works, and dozens of chamber works—the best known being his Concerto for Strings.

Soundtracks

Film score compilations

Chamber music

Orchestral music

Opera

References

External links
Nino Rota's website
 Nino Rota at Allmusic
 Nino Rota at Discogs

Discographies of Italian artists
Compositions by Nino Rota
Discographies of classical composers